This is a list of all the Ultra prominent peaks (with topographic prominence greater than 1,500 meters) in the Philippines.

See also
 List of mountains in the Philippines

Sources
 List
 Map

Ultra
Philippines
Ultras